Cary Allan Kochman (born April 1965) is an American banker and the Co-Head of Global Mergers and Acquisitions Group at Citigroup, as well as the Chairman of the Chicago Citi office. He is also a member of the Global BCMA Operating Committee.

Kochman has 30 plus years of investment banking experience. For more than twenty years, he served as the head of three leading Wall Street M&A Groups. Kochman specializes in mergers, acquisitions, activism defense, strategic hostile defense, divestitures, corporate takeovers, and is also a leading cross-border M&A expert. He serves as an advisor to board of directors, special committees, management teams, foundations, and governments. He has advised on over $1 trillion of transactions. Kochman is also a featured lecturer, speaker and panelist at numerous graduate programs, academic conferences, corporate meetings, seminars, and events.

Early life
Cary Kochman graduated from the Honors College at the University of Illinois at Chicago in 1986 with a BS in Accounting. Kochman also studied Philosophy (with an emphasis on epistomology) through the Honors College. He continued his education at the University of Chicago, where he received his J.D. from the University of Chicago Law School and his MBA from the Booth School of Business in 1990. While at the University of Chicago, he attended the London Business School and was also awarded a Nikko Fellowship for study in Tokyo, Japan. Kochman is a member of the Illinois Bar and has completed both the C.P.A. and C.M.A. exams.

Career
Today, Cary Kochman serves as the Co-Head of Global Mergers and Acquisitions Group and the Chairman of Chicago Citi office for Citigroup Global Markets Inc. He is a member of the Global Operating Committee for BCMA (Banking, Capital Markets & Advisory). He joined Citigroup in 2011 upon resigning his position at UBS as the Joint Global Head of Mergers & Acquisitions.

Kochman was recruited to UBS in March 2004 as Co-Head of Americas Mergers & Acquisitions. During his tenure at UBS, he also served as Co-Head of the Investment Banking Department's (IBD's) Chicago office and Midwest Region. He also was a member of the UBS Americas IBD Executive Committee.

Before joining UBS in 2004, Kochman worked at Credit Suisse (formerly known as Credit Suisse First Boston). He held the position of Head of the US M&A Department for the last two of his fourteen years with the company, prior to which he held various senior positions at Credit Suisse, including Head of Industrial Corporate Advisory & Finance and Head of Industrial M&A.

Advisory experience
Over the course of his career, Kochman has advised on over $1 trillion worth of transactions. He works as a strategic advisor across all industries and sectors. He advised Shire (FTSE top 20 Company) on its $82 billion sale to Takeda Pharmaceutical. This transaction is the largest Japanese M&A transaction in history, and on announcement was the largest healthcare M&A transaction in history and the 4th largest cross-border deal in history. He advised France's Schneider Electric on their acquisition of Larsen & Toubro's Electrical and Automation division (based in India). He also worked with GGP and American National Bank on their respective sale transactions to Brookfield Property Partners. He served as an advisor to Rockwell Collins on their sale to United Technologies for over $30 billion. He advised Deere & Company on their $5.2 billion acquisition of German private company Wirtgen. He advised on Baxalta's $38 billion cross-border sale to Shire. Over the course of his career he has advised on numerous high-profile transactions including: ISCAR's sale to Warren Buffett's Berkshire Hathaway, URS merger with AECOM, Bucyrus International on its sale to Caterpillar, the sale of Tim Horton's to Burger King & 3G, Robbins & Myers’ sale to National Oilwell Varco, the merger of Eaton & Cooper Industries, Verint's merger with Comverse Technology, Whitman's realignment with PepsiCo and subsequent acquisition of Pepsi Americas, Zimmer Holdings’ cross-border hostile takeover of Centerpulse AG (named "deal of the year") and the Margaret Cargill Foundation with regard to their Cargill stake monetization via the tax efficient split-off of Mosaic. This monetization funded the Margaret A. Cargill Philanthropies, creating the world's third largest funded charitable trust.

Memberships and organizations
Cary Kochman has formerly served as a member of The University of Chicago Law School Visiting Committee, as well as a member of the "Council on Chicago Booth", a committee that advises The University of Chicago Booth School of Business.

Cary Kochman is an advisory board member of GreenLight Chicago. He is a past member of the Board of Trustees for the Council for Emerging National Security Affairs (CENSA). He also served for more than a dozen years as Trustee of the Shedd Aquarium. He is also a member of numerous civic organizations, including The Commercial Club of Chicago. In the past, he served on the Advisory Board for L.E.K. Consulting.

References

1965 births
Living people
American investment bankers
Northwestern University faculty
University of Chicago Booth School of Business alumni
University of Chicago Law School alumni
University of Illinois Chicago alumni
Businesspeople from Chicago
People from Wilmette, Illinois